The Gendarmerie (French) or Rijkswacht (Dutch) was the former national Gendarmerie force of the Kingdom of Belgium.  It became a civilian police organisation in 1992, a status it retained until 1 January 2001, when it was, together with the other existing police forces in Belgium, abolished and replaced by the Federal Police and the Local Police.

History

Etymology
The word gendarme comes from Old French gens d'armes, meaning men-at-arms, whereas the Dutch name, rijkswacht, means guard of the realm.

Pre-independence
In 1795, the Belgian provinces came under French rule. It was at this time that the Rijkswacht/Gendarmerie was created. This military force had been created a short time before in France itself to replace the Marechaussee (mounted corps of marshals) of the former monarchy. The legislation which organised the new gendarmerie service in Belgium was a law dated April 17, 1798, which remained in force until 1957.

In 1815, the Belgian provinces became part of the United Kingdom of the Netherlands, ruled by King William I. The Dutch renamed the Gendarmerie the "Royal Marechaussee" and reorganised the force.

Belgium
In 1830 the Belgian Revolution occurred. After obtaining its independence, the new Belgian state created its own national Rijkswacht/Gendarmerie on the basis of the already existing constabulary. The Rijkswachters/Gendarmes operated throughout the country. From its creation, the Rijkswacht/Gendarmerie was formally part of the Belgian Army.

The major strikes and tense social conditions of the 1930s brought important changes in the organization of the Rijkswacht/Gendarmerie, in particular through the expansion of the mobile units created in 1913. In 1938 a ceremonial Royal Escort was created as part of the Gendarmerie, wearing the full dress uniform that had distinguished mounted gendarmes prior to 1914.

During the Second World War, the Rijkswacht/Gendarmerie was restricted to the role of administrative and legal police force, primarily concerned with road traffic. The majority of the Rijkswachters/Gendarmes refused to collaborate with the German occupiers. It is believed that individual gendarmes assisted the Belgian Resistance. These actions were not tolerated by the occupation authorities and from 1942 onwards the corps was deprived of many of its functions.

After the war, the service was reorganized. New units were created, and at the end of 1957, new legislation relating to the fundamental role of the Rijkswacht/Gendarmerie was passed, envisaged in the Constitution of 1830. This law confirmed the functions of the Rijkswacht/Gendarmerie and its independence from the administrative authorities. The Rijkswacht/Gendarmerie was separated from the Belgian Army Territorial Defense Force, and became a fourth department within the military. The Rijkswacht/Gendarmerie was also authorised to create its own training establishments.

During the 1960s conditions of service improved considerably. This period also saw a major increase in serious crimes (holdups, drug violations, terrorism, etc.). The Central Bureau of Investigations (CBO – Centraal Bureau voor Opsporingen (Dutch), BCR – Bureau Central des Recherches) was created, as well as a centralized radio network. Tracker dogs were employed for the first time.

During the 1980s, the Rijkswacht/Gendarmerie suffered serious problems. Much of its equipment was outdated, it was significantly understrength, and there were serious financial issues. It was also the period of fighting communist cells (CCC), serious and deadly criminal activities by gangs (like the Brabant killers, a case that was never solved) and hooliganism (Heysel Stadium disaster). Several parliamentary commissions blamed the Rijkswacht/Gendarmerie for poor investigations and law enforcement work in these cases. The Rijkswacht/Gendarmerie was threatened with disbandment, and drastic measures were taken to reorganise several units and to improve public relations.

Demilitarisation

On 1 January 1992, the Rijkswacht/Gendarmerie lost its formal military status, resulting in major changes in policies, procedures, and staff regulation. Demilitarisation allowed the force to concentrate all its resources on civilian police work. Its military functions, as well as the supervision of the Ministry of Defence, were removed.

This restructuring occurred after the 'black' 1980s of the Brabant killers, Heysel Stadium disaster, Cellules Communistes Combattantes (CCC), and other criminal and terrorist activity, against which the Gendarmerie was deemed ineffective.

Disbandment
At the end of the 1990s, following adverse reports arising from the Dutroux Affair, the Belgian government decided to dissolve the existing police forces. The parliamentary commission, which investigated the errors that were made during the search for the missing children, stated that the three police organisations did not work effectively and efficiently together. There were problems with cooperation and vital information was not exchanged.

Parliament, both the majority and the opposition, decided to abolish the existing structures, and created a new police organisation, structured in two departments: the Federal Police and the Local Police. In 2001, the Rijkswacht/Gendarmerie was dissolved.

Ranks
The ranks of the Rijkswacht/Gendarmerie were:

Uniforms
During much of its history the Rijkswacht/Gendarmerie wore a distinctive black and red uniform with high-collared tunics, white aiguillettes and wide topped kepis, dating from the nineteenth century (see first photograph above). In simplified form, this was retained as full dress wear until the late 1960s. It was thereafter replaced by a more modern uniform comprising a dark blue peaked cap with red piping, dark blue coat with open collar and red Gendarmerie insignia, a light blue shirt with tie, dark blue trousers with red piping (a single stripe on the side of the leg) and the distinctive shoulder rank insignia.

All modern Belgian police officers wear a "soft" civilian style uniform in keeping with the image required by the Community Oriented Policing-strategy.

Complement
1796: 1,080 Gendarmeries, including 76 officers and 1,002 lower ranks.

1830: 1,201 hommes répartis en 45 officiers + 1 156 gradés et gendarmes;

1866: 2,232 hommes répartis en 51 officiers + 2 181 gradés et gendarmes;

1914: 4,325 hommes répartis en 85 officiers + 4 240 gradés et gendarmes;

1921: 6,830 hommes répartis en 156 officiers + 6 674 gradés et gendarmes;

1960: 12,850 Gendarmes; including 350 officers and 12,500 lower ranks.

1969: 14,050 Gendarmes; including 550 officers + 13,500 lower ranks.

1975: 16,970 Gendarmes, including 870 officers and 16,100 lower ranks.

1986: 17,000 Gendarmes

1989: 15,900 Gendarmes

Equipment

Aircraft

Firearms
9mm semiautomatic FN Uzi Submachine Gun
9mm semiautomatic Browning Hi-Power Pistol
12 Gauge Winchester 1200 Pump-Action Shotgun
9mm H&K MP5 Submachine Gun (only by Group Diane, the SWAT team).
7.62mm FN FAL Battle rifle. Used with adjusted ammunition to fire rounds of teargas during riots.

Vehicles
VW Transporter (used for intervention)
Toyota Corolla (used for administrative work)
Citroën AX (also used for administrative work)
VW Golf GTI (used for intervention)
Opel Astra (intervention)
Opel Astra Break (K9)
Peugeot 306 break (K9)
Porsche 911 (intervention)
80 BDX wheeled APCs
Iveco 40.10WM-14 4x4 (used during demonstrations where the rijkswacht/gendarmerie acted as anti-riot police).
MOL MSB18 number 5 (used during demonstrations where the rijkswacht/gendarmerie acted as anti-riot police). Equipped with high pressure water canons.

Media references
 A Rijkswacht roadblock was included in a TV skit by the comedy duo Gaston en Leo.
 Topic of a song, "Bij De Rijkswacht" ("At the Rijkswacht"), by the Antwerp novelty band "De Strangers. Using the melody of the Village People's "In The Navy".

See also
 Law enforcement in Belgium
 Police vehicles in Belgium
 Garde Civique

References

External links
 Belgium Police portal
 Belgian Federal Police portal 
 Belgian Local Police Portal 
 History of the Gendarmerie on the site of Belgian Federal Police
 Belgian Federal Police Historical Service site

Belgium
Gendarmerie
Law enforcement in Belgium
Gendarmerie
Military units and formations established in 1796
Military units and formations disestablished in 1992
1796 establishments in France